Elton Williams can refer to:

 Elton Williams (cricketer) (born 1973), South African cricketer
 Elton Williams (footballer) (born 1973), Montserratian footballer